Eslam Tappeh may refer to:
 Eslam Tappeh, Golestan
 Eslam Tappeh, West Azerbaijan